The Gaussian gravitational constant (symbol ) is a parameter used in the orbital mechanics of the Solar System.
It relates the orbital period to the orbit's semi-major axis and the mass of the orbiting body in Solar masses.

The value of  historically expresses the mean angular velocity of the system of Earth+Moon and the Sun considered as a two body problem,
with a value of about 0.986 degrees per day, or about 0.0172 radians per day.
As a consequence of  law of gravitation and Kepler's third law, 
 is directly proportional to the square root of the standard gravitational parameter of the Sun,
and its value in radians per day follows by setting Earth's semi-major axis (the astronomical unit, au) to unity, :(rad/d) 0.5·au−1.5.

A value of    rad/day was determined by  Carl Friedrich Gauss in his 1809 work Theoria Motus Corporum Coelestium in Sectionibus Conicis Solem Ambientum ("Theory of the Motion of the Heavenly Bodies Moving about the Sun in Conic Sections").
Gauss' value was introduced as a fixed, defined value by the IAU (adopted in 1938, formally defined in 1964), 
which detached it from its immediate representation of the (observable) mean angular velocity of the Sun–Earth system. Instead, the astronomical unit now became a measurable quantity slightly different from unity.
This was useful in 20th-century celestial mechanics to prevent the constant adaptation of orbital parameters to updated measured values, but it came at the expense of intuitiveness, as the astronomical unit, ostensibly a unit of length, was now dependent on the measurement of the strength of the gravitational force.

Discussion

Gauss' constant is derived from the application of Kepler's third law to the 
system of Earth+Moon and the Sun considered as a two body problem,
relating the period of revolution to the major semi-axis of the orbit and the total mass of the orbiting bodies.
Its numerical value was obtained by setting the major semi-axis and the mass of the Sun to unity and measuring the period in mean solar days:
  2   / ≈ 0.0172021 [rad], where:
  ≈ 365.256  [days],  = (++) ≈ 1.00000304 [], and  = 1 by definition.

The value represents the  mean angular motion of the Earth-Sun system, in radians per day, equivalent to a value just below one degree (the division of the circle into 360 degrees in Babylonian astronomy was likely intended as approximating the number of days in a solar year). 
The correction due to the division by the square root of  reflects the fact that the Earth–Moon system is not orbiting the Sun itself, but the center of mass of the system.

Isaac Newton himself determined a value of this constant which agreed with Gauss' value to six significant digits.
Gauss (1809) gave the value with nine significant digits, as 3548.18761 arc seconds.

Since all involved parameters, the orbital period, the Earth-to-Sun mass ratio, the semi-major axis and the length of the mean solar day, are subject to increasingly refined measurement, the precise value of the constant would have to be revised over time. 
But since the constant is involved in determining the orbital parameters of all other bodies in the Solar System, it was found to be more convenient to set it to a fixed value, by definition, implying that the value of  would deviate from unity.
The fixed value of   0.01720209895 [rad] was taken to be the one set by Gauss (converted from degrees to radian), so that 
  42:(2 2 ) ≈ 1.

Gauss' 1809 value of the constant was thus used as an authoritative reference value for the orbital mechanics of the Solar System for two centuries.
From its introduction until 1938 it was considered a measured quantity, and from 1938 until 2012 it was used as a defined quantity, with measurement uncertainty delegated to the value of the astronomical unit. 

Role as a defining constant of Solar System dynamics

and the constant appears in this form in  his  Tables of the Sun, published in 1898.

Newcomb's work was widely accepted as the best then available and his values of the constants were incorporated into a great quantity of astronomical research. Because of this, it became difficult to separate the constants from the research; new values of the constants would, at least partially, invalidate a large body of work. Hence, after the formation of the International Astronomical Union in 1919 certain constants came to be gradually accepted as "fundamental": defining constants from which all others were derived. In 1938, the VIth General Assembly of the IAU declared,

However, no further effort toward establishing a set of constants was forthcoming until 1950. An IAU symposium on the system of constants was held in Paris in 1963, partially in response to recent developments in space exploration. The attendees finally decided at that time to establish a consistent set of constants. Resolution 1 stated that

Resolution 4 recommended

Included in the list of fundamental constants was

These resolutions were taken up by a working group of the IAU, who in their report recommended two defining constants, one of which was

For the first time, the Gaussian constant's role in the scale of the Solar System was officially recognized. The working group's recommendations were accepted at the XIIth General Assembly of the IAU at Hamburg, Germany in 1964.

Definition of the astronomical unit
Gauss intended his constant to be defined using a mean distance of Earth from the Sun of 1 astronomical unit precisely. With the acceptance of the 1964 resolutions, the IAU, in effect, did the opposite: defined the constant as fundamental, and the astronomical unit as derived, the other variables in the definition being already fixed: mass (of the Sun), and time (the day of  seconds). This transferred the uncertainty from the gravitational constant to uncertainty in the semi-major axis of the Earth-Sun system, which was no longer exactly one au (the au being defined as depending on the value of the gravitational constant).
The astronomical unit thus became a measured quantity rather than a defined, fixed one.

In 1976, the IAU reconfirmed the Gaussian constant's status at the XVIth General Assembly in Grenoble, declaring it to be a defining constant, and that

Abandonment
In 2012, the IAU, as part of a new, self-consistent set of units and numerical standards for use in modern dynamical astronomy, redefined the astronomical unit as 

and hence abandoned the Gaussian constant as an indirect definition of scale in the Solar System, recommending

The value of k based on the defined value for the astronomical unit would now be subject to the measurement uncertainty of the standard gravitational parameter,

Units and dimensions
 is given as a unit-less fraction of the order of 1.7%, but it can be considered equivalent to the square root of the gravitational constant, in which case it has the units of au⋅d−1⋅−,  where
au is the distance for which  takes its value as defined by Gauss—the distance of the unperturbed circular orbit of a hypothetical, massless body whose orbital period is  days,
d is the mean solar day (86,400 seconds),
 is the mass of the Sun.

Derivation

Gauss' original
Gauss begins his Theoria Motus by presenting without proof several laws concerning the motion of bodies about the Sun. Later in the text, he mentions that Pierre-Simon Laplace treats these in detail in his Mécanique Céleste. Gauss' final two laws are as follows:
 The area swept by a line joining a body and the Sun divided by the time in which it is swept gives a constant quotient. This is Kepler's second law of planetary motion.
 The square of this quotient is proportional to the parameter (that is, the latus rectum) of the orbit and the sum of the mass of the Sun and the body. This is a modified form of Kepler's third law.

He next defines:

 as the parameter (i.e., the latus rectum) of a body's orbit,
 as the mass of the body, where the mass of the Sun = 1,
 as the area swept out by a line joining the Sun and the body,
 as the time in which this area is swept,

and declares that 

is "constant for all heavenly bodies". He continues, "it is of no importance which body we use for determining this number," and hence uses Earth, defining
unit distance = Earth's mean distance (that is, its semi-major axis) from the Sun,
unit time = one solar day.
He states that the area swept out by Earth in its orbit "will evidently be" , and uses this to simplify his constant to

Here, he names the constant  and plugging in some measured values,  =  days,  =  solar masses, achieves the result  = .

In modern terms
Gauss is notorious for leaving out details, and this derivation is no exception. It is here repeated in modern terms, filling out some of the details.

Define without proof

where

 is the time rate of sweep of area by a body in its orbit, a constant according to Kepler's second law, and
 is the specific angular momentum, one of the constants of two-body motion.

Next define

where
, a gravitational parameter, where
 is Newton's gravitational constant,
 is the mass of the primary body (i.e., the Sun),
 is the mass of the secondary body (i.e., a planet), and
 is the semi-parameter (the semi-latus rectum) of the body's orbit.
Note that every variable in the above equations is a constant for two-body motion. Combining these two definitions,

which is what Gauss was describing with the last of his laws. Taking the square root,

At this point, define . Let , the time for the body to complete one orbit. Thus,

Note that Gauss, by normalizing the size of the orbit, has eliminated it completely from the equation. Normalizing further, set the mass of the Sun to 1,

where now  is in solar masses.
Again plugging in the measured values as they were known in Gauss's time,  =  days,  =  solar masses, yielding the result  = .

Gauss' constant and Kepler's third law
The Gaussian constant is closely related to Kepler's third law of planetary motion, and one is easily derived from the other. Beginning with the full definition of Gauss' constant,

where
 is the semi-major axis of the elliptical orbit,
 is the semi-minor axis of the elliptical orbit,
 is the orbital period,
 is the mass of the primary body,
 is the mass of the secondary body, and
 is the semi-latus rectum of the elliptical orbit.

Substituting and reducing, Gauss' constant becomes

From orbital mechanics,  is just , the mean motion of the body in its orbit. Hence,

which is the definition of Kepler's third law.

Other definitions

The value of Gauss' constant, exactly as he derived it, had been used since Gauss' time because it was held to be a fundamental constant, as described above. The solar mass, mean solar day and sidereal year with which Gauss defined his constant are all slowly changing in value. If modern values were inserted into the defining equation, a value of  would result. 

It is also possible to set the gravitational constant, the mass of the Sun, and the astronomical unit to 1. These are often called canonical units.

See also
 Gravitational constant
 Standard gravitational parameter
 Kepler's laws of planetary motion
 Mean motion

Notes

References

Further reading

External links

Glossary entry Gaussian gravitational constant  at the US Naval Observatory's Astronomical Almanac Online 
Gaussian Gravitational Constant, Wolfram ScienceWorld

Physical constants